Harold "Chief" Litwack (September 20, 1907 – August 7, 1999) was an American college basketball coach. He served as head basketball coach at Temple University from 1952 to 1973, compiling a record of 373–193. He was inducted into the Naismith Basketball Hall of Fame in 1973.

Coaching career

Litwack was born in Galicia, Austria but raised in Philadelphia, Pennsylvania. He graduated from Temple in 1930. He began his coaching career at Simon Gratz High School (1930–31), then he became head coach of the freshman team at Temple. Meanwhile, he was playing pro basketball with Eddie Gottlieb's all-Jewish Philadelphia Sphas, from 1930 to 1936. Before he became head coach at Temple in 1952, he also served briefly as assistant coach for the Philadelphia Warriors (1948–51). He died at the age of 91 in 1999.

He coached Team USA's gold-medal winning team at the 1957 Maccabiah Games in Israel, and its silver medal-winning team at the 1973 Maccabiah Games.

Head coaching record

See also

 List of NCAA Division I men's basketball tournament Final Four appearances by coach

References

1907 births
1999 deaths
American men's basketball coaches
American men's basketball players
American people of Polish-Jewish descent
Basketball coaches from Pennsylvania
Basketball players from Philadelphia
High school basketball coaches in the United States
Jewish American sportspeople
Jewish men's basketball players
Naismith Memorial Basketball Hall of Fame inductees
Philadelphia Sphas players
Philadelphia Warriors coaches
South Philadelphia High School alumni
Temple Owls men's basketball coaches
Temple Owls men's basketball players
20th-century American Jews